Xiang Baixu (born 9 August 1995) is a Chinese professional footballer who currently plays for Chengdu Rongcheng.

Club career
Xiang Baixu joined Saint-Étienne youth academy in March 2014. He transferred to China League One side Tianjin Quanjian on 7 July 2015. He made his senior debut on 18 July 2015 in a 2–1 home loss against Hunan Billows, coming on as a substitute for Rong Yu in the 67th minute. On 25 September 2016, Xiang scored his first senior in a 3–0 away victory against Xinjiang Tianshan Leopard. At the end of the season he would be part of the squad that won the 2016 China League One campaign and promotion to the top tier.

Xiang transferred to China Super League side Guangzhou R&F on 26 November 2016. He made his debut for the club on 4 March 2017 in a 2–0 home win against Tianjin Quanjian, coming on for Xiao Zhi in the 84th minute. At the end of the 2017 season, he went on to make 11 appearances in all competitions.

On 30 January 2018, Xiang transferred to China League One side Shenzhen FC. He would go on to make his debut in a league game on 11 March 2018 against Heilongjiang Lava Spring F.C. that ended in a 2–2 draw. He go on to be part of the squad would gain promotion to the top tier at the end of the league campaign. He would have limited playing time the following campaign and would eventually be allowed to transfer on a free to second tier club Chengdu Rongcheng on 9 April 2021. His debut appearance would be in a league game against Nanjing City on 30 April 2021, in a 2-0 victory. He would score his first goal for the club in a league game against Xinjiang Tianshan Leopard on 23 July 2021 in a 7-0 victory, where he also scored his first hat-trick. Establishing himself as a regular member within the team, he would aid the club to promotion to the top tier at the end of the 2021 league campaign.

Career statistics
.

Honours

Club
Tianjin Quanjian
China League One: 2016

References

External links
 

1995 births
Living people
Chinese footballers
Footballers from Chongqing
Tianjin Tianhai F.C. players
Guangzhou City F.C. players
Shenzhen F.C. players
Chinese Super League players
China League One players
Association football forwards